Pains Island is one of the West Wellesley Islands, in Queensland's Gulf of Carpentaria, Australia. it is within the Shire of Mornington. It is located 4.83 km northwest of the mainland, and less than a kilometre north of Bayley Island.

References

Islands of Queensland